"Fighters" (styled FIGHTERS) is a single by Japanese group Sandaime J Soul Brothers from Exile Tribe. It was released on September 7, 2011. It debuted in number one on the weekly Oricon Singles Chart, selling 83,048 copies.

Track List 
 FIGHTERS [3:20]
  -Orchestra Version- [5:31]
 FIGHTERS（Instrumental）
  -Orchestra Version-（Instrumental）

References 

2011 singles
2011 songs
Oricon Weekly number-one singles
Sandaime J Soul Brothers songs